The election for Resident Commissioner to the United States House of Representatives took place on November 5, 1968, the same day as the larger Puerto Rican general election and the United States elections, 1968.

Candidates for Resident Commissioner
 Santiago Polanco-Abreu for the Popular Democratic Party
 Juan Antonio Agostini for the Puerto Rican Independence Party
 Jorge Luis Córdova for the New Progressive Party
 Nicolás Nogueras, Jr. for the Republican Statehood Party
 Alfredo Nazario Tirado for the Puerto Rican People's Party

Election results

See also 
Puerto Rican general election, 1968

References 

1968 Puerto Rico elections
Puerto Rico
1968